Frédéric Kowal (born 2 October 1970 in Nogent-sur-Seine) is a French rower.

References 

 
 

1970 births
Living people
French male rowers
Rowers at the 1996 Summer Olympics
Rowers at the 2000 Summer Olympics
Olympic bronze medalists for France
Olympic rowers of France
Olympic medalists in rowing
Medalists at the 1996 Summer Olympics
20th-century French people